Boat Bluff Lighthouse is located near Klemtu on the scenic south end of Sarah Island in Tolmie Channel on the Inside Passage of British Columbia. The lighthouse was established in 1907. The skeleton tower is 24 feet high giving it a focal plane 38 feet above sea level. The station is still staffed by resident keepers.

Keepers 
 John William Webster 1932–1934
 Tom White 1934–at least 1937
 H. Shorson at least 1960
 Angus Macdonald 1965
 Clayton Ralph Marshall 1966–1967
 Ken Wallace 1967–1971
 D.L. White 1971–1973
 Charles Redhead 1974–1975
 P. Brown 1974–1978
 Clayton Restall 1979–1980
 Dieter Losel 1980– 1983
 James A. Abram 1984–1985
 Robert Akerstrom 1985–1987
 Larry Douglas 1985–1987
 Lance Barrett-Lennard 1987–1988
 Andrew Findlay 1988–1996
 Frank Dwyer 1996–1998
 Mike Higgins 2003–2008
 Gerry LaRose 2008–2010
 Howard Munn 2010-at least 2015

Climate 
Boat Bluff has an oceanic climate (Cfb) with mild summers and cool winters with heavy rainfall year-round. Boat Bluff is among the rainiest places in Canada.

See also 
 List of lighthouses in British Columbia
 List of lighthouses in Canada

References

External links 

 Aids to Navigation Canadian Coast Guard
 

Lighthouses completed in 1907
Lighthouses in British Columbia
Heritage sites in British Columbia
Lighthouses on the Canadian Register of Historic Places